Jiang Huihua (born 22 January 1998) is a Chinese weightlifter who won a gold medal at the 2015 Houston world championship.

Major results

References

External links
 
 
 

1998 births
Living people
Chinese female weightlifters
World Weightlifting Championships medalists
Weightlifters at the 2014 Summer Youth Olympics
Youth Olympic gold medalists for China
21st-century Chinese women